Quirinus Johan Harder (13 October 1801, in Rotterdam – 21 October 1880, in Vlissingen) was a Dutch architect best known for having designed a large number of lighthouses. He worked as a structural engineer for the Loodswezen, the Dutch organization overseeing all maritime pilots. Harder's lighthouses were made of cast iron, a new material at the time, which allowed for segmented fabrication and construction.

List of Harder's lighthouses

Eierland Lighthouse (Texel, 1864)
Nieuwe Sluis (1867)
Scheveningen Lighthouse (1875)
Short lighthouse of Westkapelle (1875)
Lange Jaap (Den Helder, 1877-1878)
Lage vuurtoren van IJmuiden (1878)
Hoge vuurtoren van IJmuiden (1878)
Bornrif (Ameland, 1880-1881)
Den Oever Lighthouse (1884)
Stavoren Lighthouse (1884)
Vuurduin (Vlieland, 1909)

See also
List of lighthouses in the Netherlands

References

1801 births
1880 deaths
Dutch civil engineers
Architects from Rotterdam
People from Vlissingen
19th-century Dutch architects